Wilhelm Stewen (15 September 1927 – 10 August 2012) was a Finnish equestrian. He competed in two events at the 1956 Summer Olympics.

References

External links
 

1927 births
2012 deaths
Finnish male equestrians
Olympic equestrians of Finland
Equestrians at the 1956 Summer Olympics
People from Mänttä-Vilppula
Sportspeople from Pirkanmaa